P. americanus may refer to:
 Parus americanus, a bird species in the genus Parus
 Polyprion americanus, a wreckfish species
 Potamogeton americanus, a pondweed species in the genus Potamogeton
 Protomognathus americanus, an insect species
 Pseudopleuronectes americanus, a flounder species

See also
 Americanus (disambiguation)